St. Anthony Catholic High School is a private, Roman Catholic high school located in the Monte Vista Historic District in Midtown  San Antonio, Texas, United States. It is located in the Roman Catholic Archdiocese of San Antonio.

History
St. Anthony Catholic High School was founded in 1903 by the Oblates of Mary Immaculate as a junior seminary. In 1995, the University of the Incarnate Word assumed management of St. Anthony and formed St. Anthony Catholic High School for boys; from this point on, the school would no longer remain a seminary.  In 2002 the school announced that it would become coeducational in the 2003–2004 school year. The school began accepting applications from girls in 2003.

St. Anthony Catholic High School focuses on an integrated curriculum of academics, athletics, Christian services, community activities and spirituality, with the goal of preparing graduates for a life of Christian service.

St. Anthony Catholic High School also offers admission to international students in grades 9–12.

Accreditation and membership
St. Anthony Catholic High School is accredited by the Texas Private Schools Association and is a member of the College Board, Texas Association of Private and Parochial Schools (TAPPS), National Catholic Educators Association (NCEA) and the Texas Catholic Conference Education Department (TCCED).

Academic offerings 
St. Anthony is a college-preparatory institution offering a variety of courses, including Pre-Advanced Placement (PAP), Advanced Placement (AP) and dual credit courses through the University of the Incarnate Word Senior Connection program.

In addition to the standard core curricular courses offered in the disciplines of English, mathematics, science and social studies, St. Anthony students may choose from over 18 elective courses to complete the 27.5 credit requirement. Offerings include Texas Education Agency endorsements in Arts & Humanities, Business and Industry, Multidisciplinary Studies, Public Service and STEM.

The Brainpower Connection

The Brainpower Connection is a group of elementary and secondary schools affiliated with the University of the Incarnate Word providing an educational pathway starting in pre-kindergarten and going through PhD programs. The schools in the Brainpower Connection are the University of the Incarnate Word; St. Anthony Catholic High School, for young men and women; Incarnate Word High School, for young women; St. Mary Magdalene School; Blessed Sacrament School; St. Anthony Catholic School, and its developmental pre-school, the Katherine Ryan Program; and St. Peter Prince of the Apostles Elementary School. The two high schools of the Brainpower Connection are under the management of the University of the Incarnate Word.

Notable alumni
Film director Robert Rodriguez
Colorado Governor August William "Bill" Ritter Jr. (1970–1972)
Former Green Bay Packers linebacker Mark Cooney
San Antonio Spur Charles Bassey

References

Further reading
 Gutierrez, Bridget. "St. Anthony sets sights on growth University, high school have plan to bolster Catholic tradition." San Antonio Express-News. March 8, 2002. Section: Metro / South Texas. Document ID: 0F225185B7F63C51.
 Gutierrez, Bridget. "St. Anthony aims high." San Antonio Express-News. March 8, 2002. Section: Metro / South Texas. Document ID: 0F22518547BA5290.

External links
 School Website

Catholic secondary schools in Texas
Educational institutions established in 1903
High schools in San Antonio
Private boarding schools in Texas
Catholic boarding schools in the United States
1903 establishments in Texas